Renske Stoltz is a South African netball player.

Early life
Stoltz was born in Nelspruit, Mpumalanga before shifting with her family to Rustenburg, North West. She has played netball for the past seventeen years and attended Hoërskool Rustenburg.

Career
Stoltz earned her first cap against New Zealand in the Netball Quad Series. She was also part of the under-19 Baby Proteas squad. She also participated in the Brutal Fruit Netball Cup for the North West Flames and represented her university in the local varsity championship. She also played for Loughborough Lightning in the British Fast5 All Stars Netball Championship whereby she sank a last-minute five pointer in the grand final against Team Bath to earn the championship title as well as earned the player of the series award. She also got selected to represent South Africa in the 2017 Fast5 Netball World Series in Australia. Stoltz got signed by defending Netball Superleague champions Wasps Netball for the 2018 season, though only stayed at the club for one season.

References 

1994 births
Living people
South African netball players
Netball Superleague players
2019 Netball World Cup players
South African expatriate netball people in England
Loughborough Lightning netball players
Wasps Netball players